Bhawani Mandi is a town and a municipality in Jhalawar district  in the state of Rajasthan, India.

Bhawani Mandi is also known as "The Orange City Of Rajasthan" and there is the second-largest orange market in India after Nagpur.    

Bhawani Mandi railway station divided between two states, viz. Madhya Pradesh and Rajasthan. The northern part of the platform is in Mandsaur district of Madhya Pradesh and the southern part is in the Jhalawar district of Rajasthan. It is a border town in Rajasthan. There have been many incidents where criminals took advantage of its location.

History
Bhawanimandi was established by Bhawani Singh in the year 1911, ruler of Jhalawar state when the railway passed through this state. The town was developed when some of the richest families of the region were invited to come and settle here. This turned the ancient garrison into a bustling town and soon it became the principal market town of the south-east region. Not only did the economy boom, Jhalawar also became the first Indian town to have a municipality. This was quite an exceptional characteristic in area that was still in a completely feudal land.

The founder of the orange trading in Bhawanimandi Late Shri Abdul Haleem Choudhary had been awarded by the President of India with the title " Udhdhyaan krishi Pandit" in 1971. The award was conveyed by that time PWD minister Nawab Ameenuddin Lohaaru. Late Shri Abdul Haleem Choudhary, was a beginner in orange plantation and he educated hundreds of farmers about farming oranges and result is that now Bhawanimandi has been established as " The Orange City". His descendants continued the traditions.

The state patronized music and drama in the early years and the presence of Bhawani Natyashala, a reputed theatre in those times, bears testimony to this fact. Renowned ballet performer the late Uday Shankar hailed from the court of Jhalawar.

Demographics
 India census, Bhawani Mandi had a population of 35629. Males constitute 53% of the population and females 47%. Bhawani Mandi has an average literacy rate of 69%, higher than the national average of 59.5%; with male literacy of 78% and female literacy of 58%. 14% of the population is under 6 years of age. Currently, Kailash Bohra is the chairperson.

References

Cities and towns in Jhalawar district